Badengan-e Olya (also Romanized as Bādengān-e ‘Olyā; also known as Bādangūn-e Bālā, Bādemgūn-e ‘Olyā, Bādengān-e Bālā, Bādengūn-e ‘Olyā, and Bādengūn ‘Olyā) is a village in Pataveh Rural District, Pataveh District, Dana County, Kohgiluyeh and Boyer-Ahmad Province, Iran. At the 2006 census, its population was 714, in 141 families.

References 

Populated places in Dana County